Mount Analogue may refer to:
 Mount Analogue (Antarctica), a mountain
 Mount Analogue (French: Le Mont Analogue), a novel by René Daumal (died 1944), posthumously published in 1952 in French and 1959 in English 
 Mount Analogue (album)
 "Mount Analogue", a song by Idlewild from the album Interview Music